Geir Daniel Larsen (born 16 April 1974) is a Norwegian handball player.

He hails from Narvik and played for Narvik until 1993, then Bodø HK from 1993 to 1996, Toulouse, Bodø HK again from 1998 to 2001, then Bjerringbro, Runar, Ringsted and finally Bodø for a third period from 2006.

He was capped 33 times for Norway between 1996 and 2002.

After retiring he worked with handball administration and at the Norwegian School of Elite Sport in Bodø.

References

1974 births
Living people
People from Narvik
Norwegian male handball players
Expatriate handball players
Norwegian expatriate sportspeople in France
Norwegian expatriate sportspeople in Denmark
Norwegian sports executives and administrators